The William Ayers House is a historic house located at 820 North 12th Street in Fort Smith, Arkansas.

Description and history 
It is a -story, wood-framed structure, with asymmetrical massing and a variety of dormers, gables, porches, and exterior wall finishes typical of the Queen Anne style. Detailing includes vergeboard in gable ends, wall sections with decorative cut shingles, and corbelled chimney tops. It is an outstanding example of the architectural style in the city.

The house was listed on the National Register of Historic Places on July 8, 1999.

See also
National Register of Historic Places listings in Sebastian County, Arkansas

References

Houses on the National Register of Historic Places in Arkansas
Queen Anne architecture in Arkansas
Houses completed in 1888
Houses in Fort Smith, Arkansas
National Register of Historic Places in Sebastian County, Arkansas